In functional analysis, an F-space is a vector space  over the real or complex numbers together with a metric  such that
 The metric is translation-invariant; that is,  for all 
 The metric space  is complete.

The operation  is called an F-norm, although in general an F-norm is not required to be homogeneous.  By translation-invariance, the metric is recoverable from the F-norm.  Thus, a real or complex F-space is equivalently a real or complex vector space equipped with a complete F-norm.

Some other authors use the term "F-space" as a synonym of "Fréchet space", by which they mean a locally convex complete metrizable topological vector space. 
The metric may or may not necessarily be part of the structure on an F-space; many authors only require that such a space be metrizable in a manner that satisfies the above properties.

Examples 

All Banach spaces and Fréchet spaces are F-spaces. In particular, a Banach space is an F-space with an additional requirement that 

The Lp spaces can be made into F-spaces for all  and for  they can be made into locally convex and thus Fréchet spaces and even Banach spaces.

Example 1 

 is an F-space.  It admits no continuous seminorms and no continuous linear functionals — it has trivial dual space.

Example 2 

Let  be the space of all complex valued Taylor series

on the unit disc  such that

In fact,  is a quasi-Banach algebra. Moreover, for any  with  the map  is a bounded linear (multiplicative functional) on

Sufficient conditions

Related properties 

The open mapping theorem implies that if  are topologies on  that make both  and  into complete metrizable topological vector spaces (for example, Banach or Fréchet spaces) and if one topology is finer or coarser than the other then they must be equal (that is, if ).

A linear almost continuous map into an F-space whose graph is closed is continuous.
A linear almost open map into an F-space whose graph is closed is necessarily an open map.
A linear continuous almost open map from an F-space is necessarily an open map.
A linear continuous almost open map from an F-space whose image is of the second category in the codomain is necessarily a surjective open map.

See also

References

Notes

Sources

  
  
  
 
  
  
  
  

 
Topological vector spaces

pl:Przestrzeń Frécheta (analiza funkcjonalna)